Work it Baby is a record label based in Germany and owned by Kris Menace.

Artists
Released artists include Fred Falke, Savage, Menace & Adam, Lifelike, Serge Santiago.

Releases
The 10th Anniversary Label Compilation features 35 Tracks on 2 CDs which
includes all previous Work It Baby releases, alongside unreleased exclusive tracks from
Patrick Alavi, Fred Falke, Kris Menace, Jaunt, Savage, Charlie Fanclub and a guest vocal performance from
Princess Superstar.

WIB 001	Relight - Operator	(12", S/Sided)
WIB 002	Stars On 33 - I Feel Music In Your Heart	(12", S/Sided)
WIB 003	Montana - The One 4 Me	(12", S/Sided, Ltd)
WIB 004	Heartbreakers, The - Heartbreaker	(12")
WIB 004LTD	Heartbreakers, The - Can't Stop Lovin' You	(12", S/Sided, Ltd)
WIB 005	Patrick Alavi	- Power & Glory	(12")
WIB 006	Menace & Adam - Missile Test	(12")
WIB 007	Lifelike - Running Out incl. Sebastien Leger Remix	(12", Ltd)
WIB 008	Menace & Adam vs. Quartet - Rock Dat Shit (12")
WIB 009	Patrick Alavi	- Come 2 Me (12")
WIB 010	Fred Falke / Savage (8) - Omega Man / Wait For Love	(12"/Digital)
WIB 011	Jaunt - Travelling EP	(12"/Digital)
WIB 012	Medway & Glen L* Presents Eva* - Builder	(12"/Digital)
WIB 013	Trilogyyy - Apocalypse Rock	(12"/Digital)
WIB 014  Fred Falke - Music for my friends EP (12"/Digital)
WIB 015  Charlie Fanclub - Nightbreed EP (12"/Digital)
WIB 016  Jaunt - Lipstick (12"/Digital, S/Sided)
WIB 017  Donovan feat. G.Rizo - Breaking E.P. (12"/Digital)
WIB 018  Moonbootica - Strobelight incl. Kris Menace Remix (12"/Digital)
WIB 019  Fred Falke - Chicago (12"/Digital)
WIB 020  Work it Baby 10th Anniversary Label Compilation (CD/Digital)
WIB 021  Savage feat. Fred Falke - Muzak E.P. (12"/Digital)
WIB 022  Xinobi - Day Off (12"/Digital)
WIB 023 Charlie Fanclub - Duke E.P. (12"/Digital)

References

External links
 
 

French record labels